In probability theory and statistics, the half-logistic distribution is a continuous probability distribution—the distribution of the absolute value of a random variable following the logistic distribution.  That is, for

where Y is a logistic random variable, X is a half-logistic random variable.

Specification

Cumulative distribution function 

The cumulative distribution function (cdf) of the half-logistic distribution is intimately related to the cdf of the logistic distribution. Formally, if F(k) is the cdf for the logistic distribution, then G(k) = 2F(k) − 1 is the cdf of a half-logistic distribution. Specifically,

Probability density function 

Similarly, the probability density function (pdf) of the half-logistic distribution is g(k) = 2f(k) if f(k) is the pdf of the logistic distribution. Explicitly,

References
 
 
 

Continuous distributions